Limannoye is a rural locality (a selo) in Novoalexandrovsky Selsoviet of Tambovsky District, Amur Oblast, Russia. The population was 153 as of 2018. There are 4 streets.

Geography 
Limannoye is located 28 km southeast of Tambovka (the district's administrative centre) by road. Novoalexandrovka is the nearest rural locality.

References 

Rural localities in Tambovsky District, Amur Oblast